RED Ink Records is an American record label founded in 1997 and owned and co-distributed by Sony Music Entertainment, along with RED Distribution.

Artists signed or recorded for RED Ink
Nicky Wire
Cage the Elephant
Low vs Diamond
MGMT
G-Eazy
The Rifles
Brandi Carlile
Say Anything
Bebo Valdés
Consequence
Cradle of Filth
Chucho Valdés
Alex Blake
Aberdeen City
Blues Traveler
Boys Like Girls
Joe Satriani
Manic Street Preachers
Ari Hest
Switchfoot
The Perishers
Rami Jaffee
illScarlett
Soulsavers
Aqualung
Kraak & Smaak
Jaz Coleman
Val Emmich
Matt Squire
Kaki King
19 Wheels
Edreys
The Fashion

References

American record labels
Sony Music
Record labels established in 1997